Kattradhu Thamizh (previously titled  is a 2007 Indian Tamil-language psychological thriller film written and directed by Ram, who directs his debut film. Produced by  Salmara Mohammad Sharief, it stars Jiiva, Anjali and Karunas. The film was released on 6 October 2007, to unanimous critical acclaim.

The film is about an ordinary young Tamil-postgraduate, who becomes a tortured victim of Chennai city's gentrification, fueled by the booming IT industry, slowly losing his mental balance and becoming a psychopath. According to Ram, the movie explores what might become of a society, that undervalues the education and practice of arts and humanities. The film, though commercially not successful during its release, garnered a cult following later.

Plot
Prabhakar (Jiiva) is a Tamil teacher in a private school in west Mambalam area of Chennai, who leads a lonely life in a lodge. He is frustrated and even tries to commit suicide, in a system where knowing your mother tongue and teaching it is looked down upon by a society craving for material benefits and imbalance in pay structure.

The narration is mostly in a series of flashbacks. Prabhakar, for no fault of his, is at the receiving end, terrorized by cops and on the run after killing a railway booking clerk in a fit of rage. He roams all around the country and joins some sadhus, high on pot and also grows his hair long and keeps a shaggy beard. Finally, he wants to exorcise the devils within and at gunpoint kidnaps a television anchor Yuvaan-Suang (Karunas), who records his life story, in which he confesses to killing 22 people in cold blood.

In the flashback, he reveals his past, his upbringing by a Tamil teacher Poobaal (Azhagam Perumal) and his childhood sweetheart Anandhi (Anjali) who later in his life becomes an obsession for him. The love between Prabhakar and Anandhi is shown in flashes when Prabhakar is narrating his story to Yuvaan-Suang.

Prabhakar, the kid lives in a village. He develops a friendship with the neighboring girl, Anandhi. Anandhi's family relocates to another place after a few years, after which Prabhakar's childhood is marred by tragic events as he loses his mother and grandparents in an accident. His father, a soldier, admits him in a boarding school and leaves. There, he bonds with Poobal after some initial mischief. Slowly, Prabhakar starts looking upon Poobal as his father. Years roll by, and Prabhakar grows into a young man who develops an interest in Tamil, his favourite teacher's subject.

After completing 12th grade, Prabhakar hears about the death of his beloved teacher Poobal, in an accident and travels to have one last look at him. There he sees Anandhi, his childhood sweetheart, whose father has also died in the same accident, in an argument with another family for having one look at her father's body. Prabhakar enters into a fistfight and ensures that justice is done. This incident nurtures the love between Prabhakar and Anandhi. They meet regularly thence. Prabhakar joins college where his preference for taking up Tamil is ridiculed by his roommate and a few others. Anandhi's mother does not object to her daughter's love for Prabhakar as she sees him as a source of financial support. At one point, she sells his motorcycle for her expenses. Prabhakar does not mind it. After a few years, Anandhi and her mother are forced to relocate to Anandhi's uncle's house in north India due to monetary difficulties. Prabhakar initially loses contact with her but traces her back to her uncle's home.

Somehow, Anandhi finds Prabhakar and they share a poignant moment in her uncle's home where Prabhakar asks about her health, to which Anandhi asks about the time of his departure. Prabhakar buys some clothes for her and leaves her promising that he will keep in touch. After a few mail communications, Prabhakar again loses contact with her.

Meanwhile, Prabhakar gets a job as a Tamil teacher and starts living in a lodge. He manages with a meager salary and loses focus in his personal life. On one night, he intimidates a call center employee who flees after failing to recite the Tamil verses which a drunken Prabhakar gives to him. It is after this incident that the encounter with a police inspector happens where they arrest Prabhakar for smoking in public. Prabhakar is released and he tries to commit suicide, albeit unsuccessfully. The police again get hold of him and try to book him on false charges. Prabhakar manages to escape and then unintentionally kills the railway clerk.

Later, at one point in his life, Prabhakar comes in contact with Anandhi who has turned into a prostitute. He rescues her from the pimps after holding them at gunpoint. He plans to leave the city to his hometown along with Anandhi. He leaves her at a women's hostel after which the encounter with the television anchor happens.

The police get wind of Prabhakar and try to catch him in his hometown. Both Prabhakar and Anandhi hold hands and run towards an oncoming train committing suicide at the same place where Prabhakar's dog died during his childhood.

Cast
 Jiiva as Prabhakar
 Sree Raam as Young Prabhakar
 Anjali as Anandhi
 Venba as Young Anandhi
 Aravind Raj as Evra
 Karunas as Yuvaan-Suang
 Azhagam Perumal as Poobaal Raavar / Tamil Aiyaa
 Mari Selvaraj as College Student

Production
By mid-2006, Ram an erstwhile assistant of Balu Mahendra began working on his directorial debut, initially being titled as Tamil M.A., which was later changed to Kattradhu Thamizh to get exempted from the entertainment taxation. Ram told that the film would revolve around a young man, who gets into trouble because of his education, quoting that it would show the "pathetic state of our mother tongue [Tamil] in today's society". He selected Jiiva to essay the lead character in his film, after he had seen Raam (2005) and been impressed by the actor's performance, while a newcomer Anupama from Mumbai was tipped to play the lead female character of Anandhi first, however she was later replaced by Anjali, who debuted in Tamil cinema with this film. The film was shot for nearly a year across Maharashtra, Andhra Pradesh, Kerala and Chennai, and gained high anticipation in its finishing stage, mainly due to Jeeva's looks in the promotional stills, and Ram's controversial statements at the film's soundtrack release, who cited that he had killed everyone who had hurt him during earlier days through the screenplay of the film. Jeeva had grown a full length beard for the character and cited the hardships during the shoots of the film, which he considered as his most painful experience and a "torturous affair". He revealed that he even had to undergo therapy to "come out of the character" as it was "too emotional". Ram denied that the film was his autobiography, clarifying that, unlike the protagonist in the film, he went on to work as a media consultant and that the film is a biography of a fictional character named Prabhakar.

Soundtrack

The soundtrack was composed by noted music composer Yuvan Shankar Raja to the lyrics written by Na. Muthukumar, which was released on 10 September 2007 under the film's previous title, Tamil MA. It features five tracks, including one sung by his father, Ilaiyaraaja, which was hailed mostly as the pick of the album. Noticeably, the album comprises only solo numbers and doesn't feature any female vocals.

Yuvan Shankar Raja won accolades and high praise as the soundtrack received universal critical acclaim and was described as a "musical sensation", a "must-listen for all musical freaks", a "fascinating album"  and "a solid and stirring triumph of Yuvan’s composing skills".

Critical reception
The film gained highly positive reviews and met with critical acclaim upon its release. Aspects as direction, writing, performance, music, cinematography and editing were immensely lauded and appreciated and expected to bag a bunch of awards.

Behindwoods gave the film 4 out of 5, describing it as a "Kurinji flower in Indian cinema", depicting that such a film seldom gets filmed in Indian Cinema and a "must-see film". It praised the direction and the acting and technical department, which were of "higher order", pointing out the cinematographer, S. R. Kadhir's and music composer Yuvan Shankar Raja's work. Concerning the performances, actor Jeeva, it is said, came up with a "performance of his lifetime", while newcomer Anjali was a "delight to watch and spellbinds the viewer with her beautiful fresh look and her performance". Equally impressed was Pavithra Srinivasan of Rediff, who wrote that Kattradhu Thamizh was a "hard-hitting film", while giving it 3.5 out of 5. She praised debutant director Ram and actor Jeeva's performance as Prabhakar, who she says, "leads you through dimensions that are frankly amazing".

Awards
Filmfare Best Debut Actress Anjali

2nd Vijay Awards
 Best Debut Actress - Anjali
 Best Editor - A. Sreekar Prasad
 Best Actor - Jiiva (Nominated)
 Best Director - Ram (Nominated)
 Best Story, Screenplay Writer - Ram (Nominated)
 Best Cinematographer - S. R. Kathir (Nominated)
 Best Find of the Year - Ram (Nominated)

Film Critics Awards
 Best Writer Award - Ram
 Best Music Director - Yuvan Shankar 
 Best Cinematographer Award - S. R. Kathir
 Best Lyricist - Na. Muthukumar

References

External links
 

2000s psychological drama films
2000s Tamil-language films
2007 directorial debut films
2007 drama films
2007 films
Films shot in Andhra Pradesh
Films shot in Kerala
Films shot in Maharashtra
Indian psychological drama films
Films scored by Yuvan Shankar Raja
Films shot in Chennai
Works about gentrification